The Championnat du Cameroun de football (also known as MTN Elite One since 2007 for sponsorship reasons) is the top division of association football in Cameroon, governed by the Cameroonian Football Federation since its establishment in 1961.

Prize Money 
Champions 100,000,000FCFA

Current Members 2022-23 

Aigle Royal (Dschang)
APEJES Academy (Yaoundé)
Avion (Douala)
Bamboutos FC (Mbouda)
Colombe (Yaoundé)
Canon Yaoundé (Yaoundé)
Coton Sport FC (Garoua)
Djiko FC (Bandjoun)
Eding Sport FC (Lekié)
Fauve Azur (Yaoundé)
Fortuna Mfou (Mfou)
Fovu de Baha  (Baham)
Gazelle FC (Garoua)
Les Astres FC (Douala)
PWD Bamenda (Bamenda)
Renaissance (Ngoumou)
Stade Renard (Melong)
UMS de Loum (Njombé)
Union Douala (Douala)
Yafoot (Yaoundé)
YOSA (Bamenda)

Champions 
Champions were:

1960–61: Oryx Douala
1961–62: Caïman Douala
1962–63: Oryx Douala
1963–64: Oryx Douala
1964–65: Oryx Douala
1965–66: Diamant Yaoundé
1966–67: Oryx Douala
1967–68: Caïman Douala
1968–69: US Douala
1969–70: Canon Yaoundé
1970–71: Aigle Nkongsamba
1971–72: Léopards Douala
1972–73: Léopards Douala
1973–74: Canon Yaoundé
1974–75: Caïman Douala
1975–76: US Douala
1976–77: Canon Yaoundé
1977–78: US Douala
1978–79: Canon Yaoundé
1979–80: Canon Yaoundé
1981: Tonnerre Yaoundé
1981–82: Canon Yaoundé
1982–83: Tonnerre Yaoundé
1983–84: Tonnerre Yaoundé
1984–85: Canon Yaoundé
1985–86: Canon Yaoundé
1986–87: Tonnerre Yaoundé
1988: Tonnerre Yaoundé
1989: RC Bafoussam
1990: US Douala
1991: Canon Yaoundé
1992: RC Bafoussam
1993: RC Bafoussam
1994: Aigle Nkongsamba
1995: RC Bafoussam
1996: Unisport FC (Bafang)
1997: Coton Sport FC (Garoua)
1998: Coton Sport FC (Garoua)
1999: Sable FC (Batié)
2000: Fovu Club (Baham)
2001: Coton Sport FC (Garoua)
2002: Canon Yaoundé
2003: Coton Sport FC (Garoua)
2004: Coton Sport FC (Garoua)
2005: Coton Sport FC (Garoua)
2006: Coton Sport FC (Garoua)
2007: Coton Sport FC (Garoua)
2007–08: Coton Sport FC (Garoua)
2008–09: Tiko United FC
2009–10: Coton Sport FC (Garoua)
2010–11: Coton Sport FC (Garoua)
2011–12: US Douala
2013: Coton Sport FC (Garoua)
2014: Coton Sport FC (Garoua)
2015: Coton Sport FC (Garoua)
2016: UMS de Loum (Loum)
2017: Eding Sport FC (Mfou)
2018: Coton Sport FC (Garoua)
2019: UMS de Loum (Loum)
2019–20: PWD Bamenda (Bamenda) PWD Bamenda crowned champions after the season couldn't be completed due to the effects of the COVID-19 pandemic
2020–21: Coton Sport FC (Garoua)
2021–22: Coton Sport FC (Garoua)

Titles by team

Top Scorers

References

External links 
Elite One at FIFA.com
Official site 
League at MTNfootball.com
Elite One at Cameroonian Football Federation

 
Cameroon
Football competitions in Cameroon